Vidya Rani (born Zubeida Begum) (1926 – 26 January 1952), often known as Zubeida or Zubeidaa, was an Indian actress.

Early life
Zubeida Begum was the daughter of Shri Qasembhai Mehta, a Bohra Muslim businessman, and Faiza Bai, a singer in Bombay.

Personal life
A Shia by birth, Zubeida converted according to Arya Samaj rites to marry Maharaja Hanwant Singh of Jodhpur, on 17 December 1950, in Bombay, and took on the name Vidya Rani and moved to Jodhpur. She gave birth to the couple's son, Rao Raja Hukum Singh (Tutu Bana), in Bombay on 2 August 1951.

She also had a son, Khalid Mohamed, from her first marriage. A film critic, Khalid wrote the screenplay for the film Zubeidaa (2001), directed by Shyam Benegal, loosely based on her life.

Death
Zubeidaa was killed with her husband in an airplane accident on 26 January 1952 at Godwar, Rajasthan.

After her death, Tutu was brought up by Rajmata of Jodhpur. He later went to study at Mayo College in Ajmer. He married Rao Rani Rajeshwari Kumari, daughter of Rao Raja Daljit Singh, of Alwar. The couple had one son, Parikshit Singh (b. 1974) and one daughter, Jainandini Kanwar (b. 1975).

On April 17, 1981, Tutu was beheaded and found on the streets of Jodhpur.

Till date, legends say that her unsatisfied soul haunts the palace and the royal family's school near the palace. Several rooms in the school are locked with huge locks, allegedly holding her dancing spirit.

References

Bibliography
 

Indian film actresses
Victims of aviation accidents or incidents in India
1926 births
1952 deaths
20th-century Indian actresses
Converts to Hinduism from Islam
Dawoodi Bohras
Indian Ismailis